This is a listing of the horses that finished in either first, second, or third place and the number of starters in the Groupie Doll Stakes, an American Grade 3 race for three-year-olds and up at 1-1/16 miles on synthetic surface held at Ellis Park in Henderson, Kentucky.  (List 1982–present)

References 

Lists of horse racing results
Ellis Park Race Course